Clarence Township may refer to:

 Clarence Township, Barton County, Kansas, United States
 Clarence Township, Michigan, United States
 Clarence Township, Ontario, Canada

Township name disambiguation pages